The Clear Fork is a  tributary of the Cumberland River in Kentucky and Tennessee. By the Cumberland  and Ohio rivers, it is part of the Mississippi River watershed.

The Clear Fork rises in Bell County, Kentucky, just north of the Tennessee state line.  It flows west-southwest, crossing into Claiborne County, Tennessee, and passing the village of Clairfield. Turning more to the northwest, it crosses into Whitley County, Kentucky, and continues to the Cumberland River just east of Williamsburg.

The river is paralleled by Tennessee State Route 90 for much of its upper course, then by U.S. Route 25W and Tennessee State Route 9 to the Kentucky border.  In Kentucky, the river valley is used by U.S. Route 25W and Interstate 75.

See also
List of rivers of Kentucky
List of rivers of Tennessee

References

Rivers of Kentucky
Rivers of Tennessee
Rivers of Bell County, Kentucky
Rivers of Whitley County, Kentucky
Tributaries of the Cumberland River